Lyampino is a rural locality (a village) in Levichanskoye Rural Settlement, Kosinsky District, Perm Krai, Russia. The population was 29 as of 2010. There is 1 street.

Geography 
Lyampino is located 51 km south of Kosa (the district's administrative centre) by road. Zinkovo is the nearest rural locality.

References 

Rural localities in Kosinsky District